was a Japanese statesman, politician and cabinet minister in Taishō and early Shōwa period Japan. Tokonami was involved in several government agencies throughout his career, and served in the leadership of different political parties. He was regarded by his contemporaries as a rather opportunistic politician eager for an opportunity to become prime minister.

Early life
Tokonami was born January 1866 in Kagoshima, where his father was a samurai in the service of the Shimazu clan of Satsuma Domain. After the Meiji Restoration, his father moved to Tokyo and served as a judge within the Ministry of Justice, and also was a self-taught oil painter, noted for a portrait painting of Itō Hirobumi, among other works. Takejirō, his eldest son, graduated from the law school at the Tokyo Imperial University.  One of his classmates was future president of the Privy Council Hara Yoshimichi.

Bureaucratic career
On graduation, Tokonami entered the Ministry of Finance, and later the Home Ministry. He served as Vice-Governor of Miyagi Prefecture, Chief of Police of Okayama Prefecture, and Chief Secretary of Tokyo Prefecture before being assigned the post of Governor of Tokushima Prefecture from 1904-1905, followed by Akita Prefecture from 1905-1906.

Appointed vice-minister of the Home Ministry in 1906, he assisted Home Minister Hara Takashi in his efforts to abolish the rural district as an administrative unit over the opposition of the House of Peers. Tokonami was appointed Director of the Karafuto Agency, governing the Karafuto Prefecture from 24 April 1908 to 12 June 1908.

Returning to the Home Ministry, he rose to the post of Vice-Minister for Local Affairs in 1912. While vice-minister, Tokonami arranged a conference between Japanese Shintoist, Buddhist and Christian leaders in February 1912 to coordinate efforts towards social work projects and to counter political radicalism. He also worked towards government intervention in sponsoring negotiations towards rapid resolution of labor disputes through a combination of threats and negotiations supporting labor union activity on one hand, while simultaneously using police powers to control or limit strikes. Tokonami subsequently served as President of the Japanese Government Railways in 1913.

Political career
Tokonami officially joined the Rikken Seiyūkai political party in 1913, although he had been active in party affairs prior to this time. He was elected to the House of Representatives of Japan from the Kagoshima No.1 electoral district in the Japanese General Election, 1915, and subsequently held the same seat through eight elections until his death in 1935.

Tokonami became Home Minister in the Hara administration from 1918, while concurrently retaining the post of Railway Minister He supported the Kyōchōkai, which took a Neo-Confucianist and reformist-conservative view towards social reform. His response to the Rice Riots of 1918 was to issue directives to all prefectural governors to encourage thrift and frugality among the general public, blaming the riots on the public’s infatuation with luxury.

During this time, he also presided over electoral district reforms. After Hara’s assassination in 1921, Tokonami continued in the same post under the Takahashi administration. However, in 1924, when Kiyoura Keigo became Prime Minister, Takahashi and many other Seiyūkai members rebelled against his non-party cabinet. Tokonami and Yamamoto Tatsuo organized the Seiyu Hontō party supporting Kiyoura. Tokonami continued to serve in a leadership role when the Seiyu Hontō and Kenseikai merged to form the Rikken Minseitō in 1927. However, in August 1928, he formed the Shintō Kurabu, with some 30 former Minseitō members, which cooperated with the Seiyūkai on a variety of issues, including the strengthening of the Peace Preservation Laws. He also cooperated with the Seiyūkai on a gerrymandering scheme to replace the existing large electoral districts with single-seat districts in rural areas (a Seiyūkai stronghold) and smaller two-three seat urban districts. The plan was derided by the Minseitō as “Tokomandering”.

Tokonami was accused of taking a bribe of 500,000 yuan from Warlord of Manchuria Zhang Xueliang in 1928.

Tokonami re-joined the Rikken Seiyūkai party in July 1929. He was selected to become Railway Minister under the Inukai administration in December 1931. After Inukai’s assassination in the May 15 Incident, he unsuccessfully campaigned for head of the party, but was persuaded by party elders to drop out and allow Suzuki Kisaburō to remain party head.
Tokonami returned to the cabinet as Communications Minister in the Okada administration in July 1934, over considerable internal opposition within the party, as Tokonami belonged to a group of politicians had had previously opposed him. Tokonami suffered from a heart attack while in office, and died on 8 September 1935 at his home in Tokyo. His grave is at the Tama Cemetery in Fuchū, Tokyo. He was posthumously awarded the Order of the Paulownia Flowers.

Bibliography
 Impressions of Europe and America.

Explanatory notes

Notes

References

External links

Bio at National Diet Library
 

1867 births
1935 deaths
University of Tokyo alumni
Ministers of Home Affairs of Japan
Government ministers of Japan
People from Kagoshima
People of Meiji-period Japan
Members of the House of Representatives (Empire of Japan)
Rikken Minseitō politicians
Rikken Seiyūkai politicians
Recipients of the Order of the Paulownia Flowers
Directors of the Karafuto Agency
Governors of Akita Prefecture
Governors of Tokushima Prefecture